The following lists the Turkic Council Heads of States Summits organized between 2011 and 2021. Prior to 2011, Turkic Speaking States summits were held between 1992 and 2010. Organization of Turkic States Summits are held since 2022.

1st summit 
First Turkic Council summit was held in Almaty, Kazakhstan on October 21, 2011. The theme was "Cooperation in Economic Area and Trade Area". Foundation of Turkic Business Council has been signed in the summit.

2nd summit 
Second Turkic Council summit was held in Bishkek, Kyrgyzstan on August 23, 2012. The theme was "Cooperation in Education, Science and Culture". Foundation of Turkic Academy and Turkic Culture and Heritage Foundation were signed during the summit. The official flag of the council has been approved.

3rd summit 
Third Turkic Council summit was held in Qabala, Azerbaijan on August 16, 2013. The theme was "Cooperation in Transportation".

4th summit 
Fourth Turkic Council summit was held in Bodrum, Turkey on June 5, 2014. The theme was "Cooperation in Tourism".

5th summit 
Fifth Turkic Council summit was held in Nur-Sultan, Kazakhstan on September 11, 2015. The theme was "Cooperation in Media and Information".

6th summit 

Sixth Turkic Council summit was held in Cholpon Ata, Kyrgyzstan on September 2, 2018. The theme was "Youths and National Sports". Hungary joined the organization as an observer.

7th summit 

Seventh Turkic Council summit was held in Baku, Azerbaijan on October 15, 2019. The theme was "Supporting the Small and Medium-sized Enterprises (SMEs)". Uzbekistan joined the organization as a full member. Baku Declaration is announced at the end of the summit. First President of Kazakhstan Nursultan Nazarbayev is awarded with "Supreme Order of Turkic World".

Extraordinary Video Summit 
An extraordinary video summit was held on 10 April 2020 for COVID-19 pandemic. The theme was "Cooperation and solidarity in the fight against the COVID-19 pandemic".

Informal Video Summit 
An informal video summit was held on 31 March 2021. The theme was "Turkistan – A Spiritual Capital of the Turkic World". Turkistan is declared to be spiritual capital of Turkic World.

8th summit 

Eighth (last) Turkic Council summit was held in Istanbul, Turkey on November 12, 2021. The theme was "Green Technologies and Smart Cities in the Digital Age". During the summit, leaders agreed to change organization's name to "Organization of Turkic States". Turkmenistan joined the organization as an observer. President of Azerbaijan Ilham Aliyev is awarded with "Supreme Order of Turkic World". Istanbul Declaration is announced at the end of the summit.

Summit was organized in Democracy and Freedom Island.

Additionally, Nursultan Nazarbayev, Honorary President of Turkic Council, send a video message to the summit.

References 

Organization of Turkic States